Florida modern is an architectural style.

According to professor Jan Hochstim, Florida modern reflects wider development than the Sarasota modern school.

Architect Cecil Alexander designed one house in this style.

See also
Miami Modern Architecture
Sarasota School of Architecture
Architecture of Jacksonville

References

External links
Florida History & the Arts

American architectural styles